The UTHealth School of Public Health is one of six component institutions of the University of Texas Health Science Center at Houston.

The Texas Legislature authorized the creation of a school of public health in 1947, but did not appropriate funds for the school until 1967. The first class was admitted in the fall of 1969, doubled in the second year and doubled again in the third year, with continued growth over the years since.

UTHealth brings together the School of Public Health, with the Medical School, the School of Nursing, the School of Dentistry, the Graduate School of Biomedical Sciences, the School of Biomedical Informatics, and the UT Harris County Psychiatric Center.

The school's main campus is located in Houston's famed Texas Medical Center. It originally occupied rented and borrowed space in the Medical Center but today it occupies its own building plus regional campuses in San Antonio, El Paso, Dallas, Brownsville, and Austin.

Degrees offered

The UTHealth School of Public Health  offers master's and doctoral degrees, including the M.P.H., M.S., Dr.P.H., and Ph.D. The school also offers certificate programs in public health.

The University has four departments: Biostatistics; Epidemiology, Human Genetics, and Environmental Sciences; Health Promotion and Behavioral Sciences; Management, Policy and Community Health (MPACH).

Dual degree programs 
The school also cooperates with other institutions within the University of Texas System and around the state to offer various dual degree programs.

MD/MPH

 Baylor College of Medicine
 Texas Tech Paul L. Foster School of Medicine
 University of Texas at Austin Dell Medical School
 University of Texas Rio Grande Valley School of Medicine
 University of Texas Southwestern Medical School
 UTHealth San Antonio Long School of Medicine
 UTHealth McGovern Medical School

DDS/MPH

 UTHealth School of Dentistry

JD/MPH

 University of Houston Law Center

MBA/MPH

 University of Texas at San Antonio College of Business

MSSW/MPH

 University of Houston School of Social Work
 University of Texas at Austin School of Social Work
 University of Texas at Arlington School of Social Work

MGPS/MPH

 University of Texas at Austin LBJ School of Public Affairs

MPAff/MPH

 University of Texas at Austin LBJ School of Public Affairs

MS/MPH

 UTHealth School of Biomedical Informatics

MSN/MPH

 UTHealth Cizik School of Nursing

PhD/MPH

 UTHealth School of Biomedical Informatics

References

External links
 
 School of Public Health Library
 List of degrees offered

Schools of public health in the United States
Health Science Center at Houston
Institutions in the Texas Medical Center
Educational institutions established in 1969
1969 establishments in Texas
Medical and health organizations based in Texas